Marriage leave is the legal right to enjoy leave of absence  by an employee due to them getting married without loss of wages.

Status around the world
In the Republic of Ireland, civil servants are entitled 5 days.

In Malta, every employee is entitled to 2 days' marriage leave.

In Spain, an employee is entitled to 15 calendar days from the day of the wedding.

In Vietnam, according to the Labor Code, an employee is entitled to 3 days of paid leave when they get married, and 1 day of paid leave when a child of theirs get married. They are also entitled to 1 day of unpaid leave when their father, mother, natural brother or sister gets married.

See also
Honeymoon

References

Marriage
Intimate relationships
Labor
Holidays
Social programs
Demography
Family
Family law
Marriage law